The Seligman Crystal is an award of the International Glaciological Society.

The prize is "awarded from time to time to one who has made an outstanding scientific contribution to glaciology so that the subject is now enriched" and named after Gerald Seligman.

Recipients 
Source: International Glaciological Society
 Gerald Seligman (1963)
 H. Bader (1967)
 J.F. Nye (1969)
 John W. Glen (1972)
 B. L. Hansen (1972)
 S. Evans (1974)
 Willi Dansgaard (1976)
 W. B. Kamb (1977)
 Marcel de Quervain (1982)
 William Osgood Field, Jr (1983)
 Johannes Weertman (1983)
 Mark F. Meier (1985)
 Gordon de Quetteville Robin (1986)
 Hans Oeschger (1989)
 W. F. Weeks (1989)
 Charles R. Bentley (1990)
 Akira Higashi (1990)
 Hans Röthlisberger (1992)
 Louis Lliboutry (1993)
 Anthony J. Gow (1995)
 William F. Budd (1996)
 Sigfús J. Johnsen (1997)
 Claude Lorius (1998)
 Charles F. Raymond (1999)
 S.C. Colbeck (2000)
 Geoffrey S. Boulton (2001)
 Garry K. C. Clarke (2001)
 Kolumban Hutter (2003)
 Richard Alley (2005)
 Lonnie G. Thompson (2007)
 Paul A. Mayewski (2009)
 Almut Iken (2011)
 David E. Sugden (2012)
 Paul Duval (2013)
 Richard C.A. Hindmarsh (2019) 
 Douglas R. MacAyeal (2019)
 Andrew C. Fowler (2020)
 Catherine Ritz (2020)
 Adrian Jenkins (2021)

See also

 List of earth sciences awards
 List of geology awards
 Prizes named after people

References

Glaciology
Earth sciences awards
Awards established in 1962